Skateland is a 2010 American drama film written and directed by Anthony Burns. It premiered at the Sundance Film Festival in January 2010. The film was released in the United States on May 13, 2011, with distribution by Freestyle Releasing. The film stars Shiloh Fernandez, Ashley Greene, Brett Cullen, James LeGros, Taylor Handley, and Haley Ramm.

The film is dedicated to the memory of John Hughes, who directed teen  films throughout the 1980s.

Plot
The story takes place in a small town in Texas in 1983. The film follows a 19-year-old boy named Ritchie Wheeler (Shiloh Fernandez) who spends most of his time at the local roller rink where he works and hangs out with his friends, Brent Burkham (Heath Freeman), Brent's sister Michelle (Ashley Greene) and Kenny Crawford (Taylor Handley). Ritchie is struggling trying to figure out his future, what he wants to do with his life and if he wants to go to college. When a tragedy occurs in Ritchie's life he is forced to make these decisions earlier than he expected.

Cast
 Shiloh Fernandez as Ritchie Wheeler
 Ashley Greene as Michelle Burkham
 Brett Cullen as David Wheeler
 James LeGros as Clive Burkham
 Taylor Handley as Kenny Crawford
 Haley Ramm as Mary Wheeler
 A. J. Buckley as Teddy
 Melinda McGraw as Debbie Wheeler
 D. W. Moffett as Jimmy Houston
 Heath Freeman as Brent Burkham
 Ellen Hollman as Deana Trammel
 David Sullivan as Luther
 Casey LaBow as Candy Boyce

Reception
Based on an unknown, but presumably small budget, Skateland only grossed $19,411 in the North American box office.

Upon its release, the film received mixed reviews. It holds a 47% approval rating on the review aggregator website Rotten Tomatoes, based on 30 reviews, with an average rating of 5.3/10.

Soundtrack
The soundtrack of the film is composed of numerous songs that defined the late 70s and 80s.

References

External links
 
 
 
 
 
 Skateland at Daemon's Movies 
 

2010 films
2010s teen drama films
American coming-of-age drama films
American teen drama films
2010s English-language films
Films set in 1983
Films set in Texas
Films set in the 1980s
Films shot in Louisiana
Films shot in Texas
Roller skating films
American independent films
Films scored by Michael Penn
2010 directorial debut films
2010s coming-of-age drama films
2010s American films